Griphotherion is an extinct genus of notoungulate mammal from the Eocene of Argentina. A fossil skeleton was found in the Lumbrera Formation and described in 2011 as the holotype of the type species G. peiranoi.

Description 
Griphotherion was a small "rodent-like" notoungulate, similar to members of the families Archaeohyracidae, Hegetotheriidae, and Mesotheriidae. It had many unique features that are not seen in other notoungulates, and has therefore not been placed in any notoungulate family.

References 

Typotheres
Eocene mammals of South America
Divisaderan
Mustersan
Casamayoran
Bartonian life
Paleogene Argentina
Fossils of Argentina
Salta Basin
Fossil taxa described in 2011
Prehistoric placental genera